Jesús de Otoro is a town, with a population of 11,180 (2020 calculation), and a municipality in the Honduran department of Intibucá.

Demographics
At the time of the 2013 Honduras census, Jesús de Otoro municipality had a population of 28,301. Of these, 84.35% were Mestizo, 12.97% Indigenous (12.68% Lenca), 2.37% White, 0.26% Black or Afro-Honduran and 0.05% others.

Sport
Cobán Athletic, an association football club, is based in Jesús de Otoro.

References 

Municipalities of the Intibucá Department